Jōkō-ji may refer to:

Jōkō-ji (Seto), Buddhist temple in Seto, Aichi Prefecture, Japan
Jōkō-ji (Yao), Buddhist temple in Yao, Osaka Prefecture, Japan

ja:常光寺